Jiří Král (born ) is a Czech male volleyball player. He is part of the Czech Republic men's national volleyball team. On club level he plays for Beauvais Oise Universite Club.

References

External links
 profile at FIVB.org

1981 births
Living people
Czech men's volleyball players
Olympiacos S.C. players
People from Mělník
Sportspeople from the Central Bohemian Region